The Israel Toto Cup (Gvia Ha'Toto) is an association football tournament that features clubs in the two highest divisions in Israel: the Israeli Premier League (Ligat Ha'Al), and the second division Liga Leumit.

From 1999 to 2009, the tournament was also open to clubs from the third division, 
until the cancellation of Liga Artzit.

The Toto Cup is the third most important competition in Israeli football after the Israeli Premier League and the Israeli State Cup. As it isn't highly regarded, Israeli clubs use the games to rotate their squad and give fringe players and youth players a chance. However, the Israeli Sports Betting Council pays 1.25 million NIS to the winner, while the runner-up receives 950,000 NIS.

History
League cups, in different formats, were played in Israel irregularly since the 1950s. In 1958, 1968 and 1973, anniversary cups, celebrating the 10th, 20th and 25th anniversary of independence of Israel, were played as a league cup competition, by Liga Leumit and Liga Alef  clubs separately. In 1975–76 a League Cup competition was played, won by Hapoel Hadera (in Liga Leumit) and Maccabi Ramat Amidar (in Liga Alef), but the competition wasn't played again in the following seasons.

In 1982 the IFA introduced a league cup, called Lilian Cup, after former IFA treasurer Yehuda Lilian, who died in February 1982. The competition, played at the beginning of the season, involved the top four teams from previous season. Its format was changed during its years of play, at times being played in league format and at times being played as a knock-out competition. The competition was last played in 1989–90. This cup is sometimes being referred as a predecessor of the Toto Cup, but these competitions are unconnected.

In 1984–85 the IFA introduced a League Cup competition for the two top tiers of the Israeli football league system. The first round of the competition was played on 30 October 1984, while the first finals, played on 7 May 1985, was won by Maccabi Yavne (Liga Leumit) and Hapoel Ashkelon (Liga Artzit). Before the 1986–87 Season the Israeli Sports Betting Council started sponsoring the competition, which was renamed "Toto Cup", and guaranteed rewards for participation and  achievements in the competition.

In 1999–2000, following the creation of the Israeli Premier League, the competition for the two top tiers was merged, so that the competition was played by the 24 top teams, and a separate competition was introduced for the third tier, Liga Artzit. In 2004–05 the competitions were separated once again so starting from this season and up until the closure of Liga Artzit at the end of the 2008–09 season there were three league cup competitions running, for each of the three top divisions.

In the 2013–14 season, the Toto Cup was not played due to a disagreement between the Israeli Sports Betting Council and the IFA following the publication of a report by a committee headed by Yaron Zelekha which was set up to examine the way football in Israel was managed. The IFA and the Israeli Sports Betting Council reached an agreement in October 2013, which confirmed the cancellation of the 2013–14 competitions.

Current competition structure

Group stages

Premier League
The group stages are usually played before the opening of the football leagues and take place from August to October, and the finals take place in January. the 14 teams in league are divided into three groups: five teams in two groups, and four teams in one group. Each team plays against each team once. The two teams placed last in each group are eliminated with the rest of teams advance to the quarterfinals.

Liga Leumit
The group stages are usually played before the opening of the football leagues and take place from August to September, and the finals take place in December. the 16 teams in league are divided into four groups, four teams in each group. Each team plays against each team once, making a total of three games for each team. The best two teams in each group advances to the quarterfinals.

Further rounds
Until 2009, the eight teams that played in the quarterfinals played in a regular knock-out, two meetings for each team in the quarterfinals. Each team played one meeting at their home in the order determined in a raffle.

From the 2009–10 season until the 2012–13 season both Al and Leumit cups had just one game was played in the quarterfinals on the home ground of one of the team by a raffle just like the State Cup games.

Since the 2012–13 season, Al teams play each other twice in the quarterfinals while Leumit play each other once.

The four winning teams who progressed to the semifinals play against their opponent once. the two winners reaches the final and the final winner is the cup winner. the final and the Toto Cup semifinals are all played in the same stadium.

From the quarterfinals and above if a match is drawn, the game is settled with extra time and penalty shootouts.

Winners

Winnings table

External links
Israel Football Association
Toto Cup Al Israel Football Association 
Toto Cup Leumit Israel Football Association 
Toto Cup Artzit – 1999–2008 Israel Football Association 
Toto Cup Artzit – 2008–2009 Israel Football Association

References

 
Recurring sporting events established in 1984
1984 establishments in Israel